The Corn Cuchulainn is a greyhound racing competition held annually at Shelbourne Park and was formerly held at Harold's Cross Stadium in the city district of Harold's Cross, Dublin, Ireland.  

It is a major competition and is an integral part of the Irish greyhound racing calendar.  The competition was known as the Sean Kelly 750 in 1980. 

In 2017 following the closure of Harold's Cross the race was switched to fellow Dublin track Shelbourne Park.

Past winners

Venues & Distances
1963-2016 (Harolds Cross, 750y)
1999-1999 (Shelbourne Park, 750y)
2017-present (Shelbourne Park, 750y)

Sponsors
1978-1978 (Sean Kelly Dublin Bookmakers)
2004-2007 (Vodafone)
2008-2009 (Accelerated Drain Cleaning)
2010-2020 (Gain Nutrition)

References

Greyhound racing competitions in Dublin (city)
Recurring sporting events established in 1961